Simon M. Marquart (born 1 November 1996) is a Swiss BMX cyclist.

In 2021 he became the first Swiss BMX racer to win a World Cup event when he won his maiden title at the season opener in Verona, Italy. He was selected in the Swiss team for the Cycling at the 2020 Summer Olympics – Men's BMX racing.

At the 2022 UCI BMX World Championships he finished 1st in the elite men's event.

References

External links
 
 
 
 
 

1996 births
Living people
BMX riders
Swiss cyclists
Olympic cyclists of Switzerland
Cyclists at the 2020 Summer Olympics
UCI BMX World Champions (elite men)